Emanuel Eduardo Pimenta Vieira da Silva, GOIH (born 4 December 1985), is a Portuguese sprint canoer. He was born in Braga. A finalist at the 2004 Olympics and medalist at the 2012 Olympics, he is Portugal's most successful kayak sprinter since the 1980s.

Despite training with very limited resources, Silva became outright Portuguese individual champion over three distances (500 m, 1000 m and 10,000 m) at the age of just sixteen.

In 2003 he starred at the world junior championships in Komatsu, Japan, winning the K1 500 m gold medal and silver in the K1 1000 m. He then competed in his first senior world championships, in Gainesville, USA, placing a highly-creditable sixteenth in the K-1 1000 m.

In 2004 he reached his first senior final, finishing in seventh place at the European championships in Poznań, Poland. Still only eighteen years old, and technically a junior, he was the second-youngest competitor in the blue riband K-1 1000 m event at the Athens Olympics and exceeded expectations by reaching the final. There he finished in seventh place in a time of 3:33.862.

He followed up his Athens success by winning the 2005 European Under-23 Championship K1 1000 m final in Plovdiv, Bulgaria. Later in the season he won the first senior medal of his career, the K1 1000 m bronze at the European Championships in Poznań, Poland.

In 2006 he retained his European under-23 title at Schinias, Greece. In senior competition he achieved his best-ever world championship placing, seventh, at the World Championships in Szeged.

Silva was not as successful at the 2008 Summer Olympics in Beijing as he was eliminated in the semifinals of both the K-1 500 m and the K-1 1000 m event.

At the London Olympic Games, he won the silver medal along with Fernando Pimenta in the K-2 1000 m event.  Since then he has also become world champion in the K-2 500 m in 2013 with João Ribeiro.

Silva is now a member of the Clube Náutico de Prado, Vila de Prado, Portugal.

Orders
 Grand Officer of the Order of Prince Henry

References

External links
 Official website
 Portuguese Canoe Federation
 

1985 births
Living people
Sportspeople from Braga
Canoeists at the 2004 Summer Olympics
Canoeists at the 2008 Summer Olympics
Canoeists at the 2012 Summer Olympics
Canoeists at the 2016 Summer Olympics
Canoeists at the 2020 Summer Olympics
Olympic canoeists of Portugal
Portuguese male canoeists
Olympic silver medalists for Portugal
Olympic medalists in canoeing
Medalists at the 2012 Summer Olympics
Canoeists at the 2015 European Games
European Games competitors for Portugal
Canoeists at the 2019 European Games
Golden Globes (Portugal) winners